Kennicutt Point is the south entrance point of Wood Bay on the Borchgrevink Coast. It was named by the Advisory Committee on Antarctic Names in 2005 after Mahlon Kennicutt II, Geochemical and Environmental Research Group, Texas A&M University; United States Antarctic Program investigator of marine-habitat change in McMurdo Sound, near the McMurdo Station, and in Arthur Harbor in proximity of the Palmer Station for several summer seasons between 1990 and 2005.

References

Borchgrevink Coast